Timander is a surname. Notable people with the surname include:

Timander (soldier), officer of Alexander the Great
Alice Timander (1915–2007), Swedish dentist and actress
Mattias Timander (born 1974), Swedish ice hockey player